Pavilonis is a Lithuanian surname.
Rolandas Pavilionis
Žygimantas Pavilionis

Lithuanian-language surnames
lt:Pavilionis
de:Pavilionis